Edward C. Joullian III (-‡ 2005 to 2008) served as the national president of the Boy Scouts of America from 1982 to 1984.

Background
Joullian was awarded the Bronze Wolf, the only distinction of the World Organization of the Scout Movement, awarded by the World Scout Committee for exceptional services to world Scouting. He was also a 1984 recipient of the Silver Buffalo Award. He was one of only six men to hold all four top-tier Scouting awards, the Bronze Wolf, the Silver Buffalo,  the Silver Antelope, and the Distinguished Eagle Scout Award.

References

Year of death missing
Recipients of the Bronze Wolf Award
Year of birth missing
Presidents of the Boy Scouts of America